The EmTech (short for "Emerging Technologies") conference, produced by the Massachusetts Institute of Technology's Technology Review magazine, is an annual conference highlighting invention and new developments in engineering and technology.  Started in 1999, the 2011 conference is planned for October 18–19 at MIT. Emtech is also organised in different regions such as in Europe, MENA, Latin America, Asia Pacific, China and India.

In addition to two days of presentations, the conference highlights the winners of the annual TR35 award, recognizing the world's top 35 innovators under the age of 35. Some of the most famous winners of the award include Larry Page and Sergey Brin (creators of Google), Mark Zuckerberg (creator of Facebook), Jack Dorsey (creator of Twitter), and Konstantin Novoselov, who later won the Nobel Prize in Physics.

References

Technology conferences